Neemach Mata Temple is located on a hill on the banks of the Fateh Sagar Lake in the city of Udaipur, Rajasthan,India. This temple is located on a green hill in the Dewali (pronounced Dey-vaa-lee) area of Udaipur. It has both stairs and uphill slope walk way to climb, which is around 900 metres long. It enshrines the stone idol of Neemach Mata Devi. There is also an idol of Lord Ganesh and three west-facing lions of stone.

History
Neemach Mata is the kuldevi of Dokot khandan of Bhatnagar(kayasth)and all the dokot family assemble on the occasion of Haryali amavsya and perform the pooja every year.

Geography
The temple is located at the banks of Fatehsagar Lake.This temple is located on a green hill in the Dewali (pronounced Dey-vaa-lee) area of Udaipur. It has both stairs and uphill slope walk way to climb, which is around 900 metres long.

References

External links
 Neemach Mata Mandir (archived 2009)

Tourist attractions in Udaipur
Hindu temples in Udaipur